The Society of Petroleum Engineers (SPE) is a 501(c)(3) not-for-profit professional organization whose stated mission is "To connect a global community of engineers, scientists, and related energy professionals to exchange knowledge, innovate, and advance their technical and professional competence regarding the exploration, development, and production of oil and gas and related energy resources to achieve a safe, secure, and sustainable energy future."

SPE provides a worldwide forum for oil and natural gas exploration and production (E&P) professionals to exchange technical knowledge and best practices. SPE manages OnePetro and PetroWiki, in addition to publishing magazines, peer-reviewed journals, and books. SPE also hosts more than 100 events each year across the globe as well as providing online tools and in-person training opportunities. SPE's technical library (OnePetro) contains more than 200,000 technical papers—products of SPE conferences and periodicals, made available to the entire industry.

SPE has offices in Dallas, Houston, Calgary, London, Dubai and Kuala Lumpur. SPE is a professional association for more than 119,000 engineers, scientists, managers, and educators. There are about 52,000 student members of SPE.

History
The history of the SPE began well before its actual establishment. During the decade after the 1901 discovery of the Spindletop field, the American Institute of Mining Engineers (AIME) saw a growing need for a forum in the booming new field of petroleum engineering. As a result, AIME formed a standing committee on oil and gas in 1913.

In 1922, the committee was expanded to become one of AIME's 10 professional divisions. The Petroleum Division of AIME continued to grow throughout the next three decades. By 1950, the Petroleum Division had become one of three separate branches of AIME, and in 1957 the Petroleum Branch of AIME was expanded once again to form a professional society.

SPE became tax-exempt in March 1985.

The first SPE Board of Directors meeting was held 6 October 1957, making 2007 the 50th anniversary year for SPE as a professional society. 6 October 2017 was the 60th anniversary of SPE. In the last sixty years SPE has endeavored to provide resources to petroleum engineers where they need them most. SPE continues to operate more than 100 events around the world, and publish technically relevant information online, in-print, and delivered to their member inboxes. SPE offers a wide array of awards and scholarships to recognize industry champions and future leaders.

Membership 
SPE is a non-profit association for petroleum engineers. Petroleum engineers who become members of SPE gain access to several member benefits like a complimentary subscription to the Journal of Petroleum Technology, unlimited free webinars, and discounts on SPE events (conferences, workshops, training courses, etc.) and publications. SPE members also are given exclusive access to SPE Connect and the SPE Competency Management Tool. SPE Connect is a site and app for SPE members to exchange technical knowledge, answer each other's practical application questions, and share best practices.

SPE is made up of about 119,000 members in 138 countries. SPE Sections are groups of SPE Professional Members, and SPE Student Chapters are groups of SPE Student Members typically named for the hosting university or a geographical region. 67,000+ professional members are affiliated with 203 SPE Sections, and about 52,000 student members are affiliated with the 427 SPE Student Chapters.

SPE annually grants scholarships to student members.

Awards
Annually, SPE recognizes individuals for their contribution to the oil and gas industry at the regional and international levels.

All individuals who receive SPE Awards were nominated by either an industry colleague, mentor, etc., except for recipients of the Cedric K. Ferguson Young Technical Author Medal, which is awarded to SPE members who author a paper approved for publication in an SPE journal (peer-reviewed journals on oil and gas topics) before age 36. Eligibility for the awards is denoted online.

SPE International Awards are announced online, featured in the Journal of Petroleum Technology, and presented at the Annual Technical Conference and Exhibition.

International awards 
Membership awards
 Honorary Membership
 Distinguished Membership
Technical awards
 Anthony F. Lucas Technical Leadership Gold Medal
 John Franklin Carll Distinguished Professional Award
 Lester C. Uren Technical Excellence Award
 Completions Optimization and Technology Award
 Drilling Engineering Award
 Formation Evaluation Award
 Health, Safety, and Environment Award
 Management and Information Award
 Production and Operations Award
 Projects, Facilities and Construction Award
 Reservoir Description and Dynamics Award

Professional awards
 Cedric K. Ferguson Young Technical Author Medal
 Charles F. Rand Memorial Gold Medal
 DeGolyer Distinguished Service Medal
 Distinguished Achievement Award for Petroleum Engineering Faculty
 Distinguished Lifetime Achievement Award
 Distinguished Service Award
 Public Service Award
 Robert Earll McConnell Award
 Young Member Outstanding Service Award
 Sustainability and Stewardship in the Oil and Gas Industry Award

Regional awards 
SPE grants technical and professional awards at the regional level. To be considered for these awards, one must be nominated online. Regional technical award eligibility is described online. SPE regional award recipients are considered for the international level of the award they received in the following award season. Regional awards are presented at regional or section meetings. 
Technical awards
 Completions Optimization and Technology
 Drilling Engineering 
 Formation Evaluation
 Health, Safety, Social Responsibility and Environment 
 Management and Information
 Production and Operations 
 Projects, Facilities and Construction
 Reservoir Description and Dynamics
Professional awards
 Distinguished Achievement Award for Petroleum Engineering Faculty
 Distinguished Corporate Support Award
 Public Service Award
 Regional Service Award
 Young Member Outstanding Service Award

Distinguished Lecturers 
The SPE Distinguished Lecturer Committee (DL) each year selects a group of nominees to become SPE Distinguished Lecturers. SPE Distinguished Lecturers are nominated for the program and selected by the committee to share their industry expertise by lecturing at local SPE sections across the globe. Nominees are notified of their nomination and must submit a summary of their biography, a presentation that can be given in thirty minutes or less, and additional information for the DL committee. The schedule of DL talks is available online. Some DL talks are very popular and are made available online as webinars.

Publications 
SPE publishes peer-reviewed journals, magazines, and books. Technical papers presented at SPE conferences or approved for publication in SPE peer-reviewed journals are also published to OnePetro.org.

Peer-reviewed journals 
SPE publishes five peer-reviewed journals. These are published online to OnePetro.org and through an SPE Peer-Reviewed Journals app.

SPE journals:
 SPE Drilling and Completion is focused on the drilling techniques and aspects that effect drilling operations. This publication succeeds SPE Drilling Engineering.
 The SPE Economics & Managements journal covers resource evaluation, portfolio management and other petroleum economics topics.
The SPE Journal is the flagship journal of SPE. It publishes research-based papers which provide insights into emerging technology and theories in the oil and gas industry. Its first issue was published in 1996. 
 SPE Production and Operations issues faced when operating downhole equipment, multiphase flow, or stimulation. 
 SPE Reservoir Evaluation and Engineering  published technical papers about reservoir management, characterization, and simulation.

Magazines 
SPE publishes five magazines: 
 Journal of Petroleum Technology (JPT) is the SPE flagship magazine, providing articles on oil & gas technology advancements, issues, and other exploration and production industry news. The JPT newsletter is sent out weekly on Wednesdays. Anyone may sign up to receive the JPT newsletter, though some content is only accessible to members of SPE. Every SPE member receives a complimentary subscription to JPT.
 Oil and Gas Facilities (OGF) is focused on delivering the latest news on project and technology shifts in the industry.
 The Way Ahead (TWA) is by and for young professional members of SPE. It is the newest SPE magazine. It was first published in 2006 and moved from print to online in 2016.
 HSE Now is aimed at covering the changes in health, safety, security, environmental, social responsibility, and regulations that impact the oil and gas industry.
 Data Science and Digital Engineering presents the evolving landscape of digital technology and data management in the upstream oil and gas industry.

Books 
SPE has published many books over the years. The Petroleum Engineering Handbook (PEH) was a seven-volume series SPE published. The individual handbooks are still available in digital and print formats.

SPE continues to publish new books on practical applications of new technologies that may be used to produce oil and natural gas more efficiently. SPE book authors sometimes attend book signings at the Annual Technical Conference and Exhibition. SPE's bookstore offers books on drilling, enhanced oil recovery, and reservoir characterization. SPE members receive a significant discount on purchases through the SPE Bookstore.

PetroWiki
PetroWiki was created from the seven-volume Petroleum Engineering Handbook. PetroWiki preserves PEH content in unaltered form (page names that start with PEH:), while allowing SPE's membership to update and expand content from the published version. Pages that do not have "PEH:" at the beginning may have started with content from the PEH, but have been modified over time by contributors to the wiki.

Content in PetroWiki is moderated by at least two members with subject matter expertise. This helps to ensure that the information found in PetroWiki is technically accurate.

Unlike some other online wikis, PetroWiki content is copyrighted by SPE.

OnePetro 
Launched in March 2007, OnePetro.org is a multi-society library that allows users to search for and access a broad range of technical literature related to the oil and gas exploration and production industry. OnePetro is a multi-association effort that reflects participation of many organizations. The Society of Petroleum Engineers (SPE) operates OnePetro on behalf of the participating organizations. SPE operates and provides customer service support for OnePetro.

OnePetro currently contains more than 200,000 documents, with more being added frequently. The number of documents is expected to grow as additional organizations choose to make their materials available through OnePetro. OnePetro is the first online offering of documents from some organizations, making these materials widely available for the first time.

The following organizations currently have their technical documents available through OnePetro:
 American Petroleum Institute (API)
 American Rock Mechanics Association (ARMA)
 American Society of Safety Engineers (ASSE)
 BHR Group
 International Society of Offshore and Polar Engineers (ISOPE)
 International Petroleum Technology Conference (IPTC)
 International Society for Rock Mechanics (ISRM)
 National Energy Technology Laboratory (NETL)
 Offshore Mediterranean Conference (OMC)
 Offshore Technology Conference (OTC)
 Pipeline Simulation Interest Group (PSIG)
 NACE International (corrosion engineers)
 Petroleum Society of Canada (PETSOC)
 Society of Exploration Geophysicists (SEG)
 Society of Petroleum Engineers (SPE)
 Society of Petroleum Evaluation Engineers (SPEE)
Society of Petrophysicists and Well Log Analysts (SPWLA)
 Society for Underwater Technology (SUT)
 World Petroleum Council (WPC)

SPE Petroleum Engineering Certification
The SPE Petroleum Engineering Certification program was instituted as a way to certify petroleum engineers by examination and experience. This certification is similar to the Registration of Petroleum Engineers by state in the United States.

Certified professionals use "SPEC" after their name.

Industry resources

Petroleum reserves and resources definitions 
The Society of Petroleum Engineers has developed a system for evaluating oil and gas reserves and resources. The Petroleum Resources Management System (PRMS) is used by oil and gas companies in determining their reserves and serves as the primary basis for reporting rules established by the United States Securities and Exchange Commission.

Salary survey 
SPE conducts an annual survey of members across the globe to learn more about the compensation petroleum engineers receive. In 2017, SPE found that the average salary (base pay) for a petroleum engineer was USD $151,122. SPE salary survey report and data files are available for purchase through the SPE Bookstore.

SPE Energy4me
SPE's Energy4me program educates students aged 10 to 17 about the energy industry. Through fun and interactive hands-on activities that teach science, engineering and math concepts, Energy4me encourages young students to pursue engineering as a career field, ensuring the future workforce in the oil and natural gas industry. Energy4me conducts workshops for both teachers and students at many SPE conferences around the globe, and SPE members are encouraged to visit science classrooms at their local schools to conduct brief presentations. Energy4me educates thousands of children and teachers globally.

SPE CONNECT
SPE Connect is intended for members to collectively invest, contribute, and build on a body of knowledge for the benefit of the industry as a whole. SPE Connect Features include: 1) Your Online Profile and Inbox; 2) Technical Section Communities; 3) Non-Technical Communities; 4) SPE's Member Directory; 5) Discussions, Blogs, and Libraries; 6) Networking Opportunities. Stay connected via downloading the FREE SPE International APP on iTunes or Google Play.

References

External links
 SPE website
 http://petrowiki.org
 OnePetro.org

International professional associations
Engineering societies based in the United States
Petroleum engineering
International organizations based in the United States
Organizations based in Dallas
Society of Petroleum Engineers